Mark Treitel co-wrote with Shoe Schuster the 2005 pilot for NBC The Sperm Donor.  Mark also starred in the NBC cable station Bravo reality television show Situation: Comedy.

External links

Mark Treitel
Bravo's Situation: Comedy
Celebrity Blogs

American television writers
American male television writers
Living people
Year of birth missing (living people)